is a Japanese mathematician. He was a student of Mikio Sato at the University of Tokyo. Kashiwara made leading contributions towards algebraic analysis, microlocal analysis, D-module theory, Hodge theory, sheaf theory and representation theory.

Kashiwara and Sato established the foundations of the theory of systems of linear partial differential equations with analytic coefficients, introducing a cohomological approach that follows the spirit of Grothendieck's theory of schemes. Bernstein introduced a similar approach in the polynomial coefficients case. Kashiwara's master thesis states the foundations of D-module theory. His PhD thesis proves the rationality of the roots of b-functions (Bernstein–Sato polynomials), using D-module theory and resolution of singularities. He was a plenary speaker at International Congress of Mathematicians, 1978, Helsinki and an invited speaker, 1990, Kyoto.

He is a member of the French Academy of Sciences and of the Japan Academy.

Concepts and Theorems named after Kashiwara 

 Kashiwara constructibility theorem
 Kashiwara index theorem
 Kashiwara–Malgrange filtration (after Kashiwara and Bernard Malgrange)
 Cauchy-Kowalevsky-Kashiwara theorem (after Kashiwara, Augustin-Louis Cauchy and Sofya Kovalevskaya )
 Kashiwara operators
 Kashiwara crystal basis

List of books available in English
Seminar on micro-local analysis, by Victor Guillemin, Masaki Kashiwara, and Takahiro Kawai (1979), 
Systems of microdifferential equations, by Masaki Kashiwara; notes and translation by Teresa Monteiro Fernandes; introduction by Jean-Luc Brylinski (1983), 
Introduction to microlocal analysis, by Masaki Kashiwara (1986)
Foundations of algebraic analysis, by Masaki Kashiwara, Takahiro Kawai, and Tatsuo Kimura; translated by Goro Kato (1986), 
Algebraic analysis : papers dedicated to Professor Mikio Sato on the occasion of his sixtieth birthday, edited by Masaki Kashiwara, Takahiro Kawai (1988), 
Sheaves on manifolds : with a short history <Les débuts de la théorie des faisceaux> by Christian Houzel, by Masaki Kashiwara, Pierre Schapira (1990), 
Topological field theory, primitive forms and related topics, by Masaki Kashiwara et al.(1998), 
Physical combinatorics, Masaki Kashiwara, Tetsuji Miwa, editors (2000), 
MathPhys Odyssey 2001: integrable models and beyond: in honor of Barry M. McCoy, Masaki Kashiwara, Tetsuji Miwa, editors (2002), 
D-modules and microlocal calculus, Masaki Kashiwara; translated by Mutsumi Saito (2003), 
Categories and sheaves, Masaki Kashiwara and Pierre Schapira (2006),

List of books available in French
Bases cristallines des groupes quantiques, by Masaki Kashiwara (rédigé par Charles Cochet); Cours Spécialisés 9 (2002), viii+115 pages,

Notes

External links 

Fifty years of Mathematics with Masaki Kashiwara, by Pierre Schapira
List of Publications
Photo
Videos of Masaki Kashiwara in the AV-Portal of the German National Library of Science and Technology
2018 Kyoto Prize in Basic Sciences

1947 births
Living people
20th-century Japanese mathematicians
21st-century Japanese mathematicians
University of Tokyo alumni
Academic staff of Kyoto University
Academic staff of Nagoya University
Members of the Japan Academy
Members of the French Academy of Sciences
Kyoto laureates in Basic Sciences